Thomas Buxton (1863–28 May 1939) was a Liberal Party Member of Parliament.

Biography

Early life and career
He was born in Lincolnshire, England, in 1863 and came to New Zealand with his family in 1865. He was the son of New Zealand politician Searby Buxton.

When young he gained employment at the Farmers' Co-operative Association at Timaru remaining there until he commenced business on his own account 18 years later. He became a grain and produce merchant, first in Temuka and later in Timaru.

He was the chairman of the Temuka sports association and actively played tennis, cricket and golf.

Political career

He was one of the inaugural members of the Temuka Borough Council and was the Mayor of Temuka for 10 years.

He was a member of the Executive Council (without portfolio) in 1912 in the Liberal Government.

After leaving Parliament Buxton remained politically active and was for many years a local organiser for the Liberal Party, and later he was the national organiser for its successor the United Party.

Later life and death
He later became an organiser of the Farmers' Union. Buxton moved to Christchurch in 1921, where he spent the remainder of his life. He died there on 28 May 1939.

Notes

References

|-

1863 births
1939 deaths
English emigrants to New Zealand
Mayors of places in New Zealand
New Zealand Liberal Party MPs
Members of the Cabinet of New Zealand
Members of the New Zealand House of Representatives
New Zealand MPs for South Island electorates
United Party (New Zealand) politicians